Ivanna is a 1959 Soviet anti-religious drama film directed by Viktor Ivchenko. It was seen by 30.2 million viewers in the USSR.

Plot
The film is set in the year 1940. Ivanna Stavnichaya, the daughter of Greek Catholic priest Theodos, goes to Lviv University, which opened after the establishment of Soviet power. However, the secretary of the admission committee, a hidden nationalist, declares to the girl that she was not accepted because of "social origin". Ivanna accuses the Soviet authorities of injustice, while in fact her fiancé, the fanatical Greek Catholic Roman Hereta, hid from her the truth about the call to study which came from the university. Upset Ivanna asks for help from Metropolitan Andrey Sheptytsky, head of the Greek Catholic church in Ukraine, and he advises Ivanna to go to the monastery.

The Second World War begins, the Germans enter Lviv. Ivanna sees the ministers of the church cooperating with the invaders, blessing the massacre of partisans, Jews and civilians. Ivanna's girlfriend, Julia, joins up the girl with the partisans. Ivanna enters their detachment, but the Ukrainian Greek Catholics learn about this and begin hunting for the young partisan ... Ivanna's life ends tragically - the German invaders arrest her and after cruel torture execute her.

Cast
 Inna Burduchenko as Ivanna
 Anatoly Motornyi as Theodosius Stavnycyi
 Dana Kruk as Yulya, a friend of Ivanna
 Did Panas as Panas Stepanovych Holub
 Evgeny Ponomarenko as comrade Taras Sadakly
 Vladimir Goncharov as captain Zhurzhenko
 Vladimir Arkushenko as Mykola Andriovych Zubar, senior lieutenant of the NKVD
 Anatoly Yurchenko as Oleksa Gavrylyshyn
 Lev Olevsky as Emile Léger, french musician
 Dmitry Stepovoi as metropolitan Andrey Sheptytsky
 Olga Nozhkina as abbess
 Georgi Polinsky as Dasko
 Alexander Korotkevich as "railwayman"
 Vladimir Dalsky as oberfuhrer Alfred Dietz
 Vyacheslav Voronin as Roman Gereta, the fiancé of Ivanna
 Boris Mirus as Dmytro Andriovych Kablak, Secretary of the Admission Committee
 Vasily Fushchych as Zenon Verhola
Maria Kapnist as nun

Anathema
The film, released in 1960 in Catholic Poland, was anathematized by Pope John XXIII.

References

External links

1959 films
Soviet drama films
1959 drama films
Dovzhenko Film Studios films
Films about religion